A Parlimentaire (also Parlementaire) is defined by the U.S. Department of Defense as "an agent employed by a commander of belligerent forces in the field to go in person within the enemy lines for the purpose of communicating or negotiating openly and directly with the enemy commander".

History
Even in war the belligerents sometimes need to communicate, or negotiate. In the Middle Ages heralds were used to deliver declarations of war, and ultimata as a form of one-sided communication. But for two-sided communication agents were needed that could also negotiate. These usually operated under a flag of truce and enjoyed temporary inviolability according to the  customs and laws of war. Breaches of the customary protection of parlimentaires were deemed perfidy.

International Law
Later, these customs and protections were codified in international law.  Articles 32-34 of the Hague Conventions (1907) state:

Article 32
An individual is considered a parlementaire who is authorized by one of the belligerents to enter into communication with the other, and who carries a white flag. He has a right to inviolability, as well as the trumpeter, bugler, or drummer, the flag-bearer, and the interpreter who may accompany him.

Article 33
The Chief to whom a flag of truce is sent is not obliged to receive it in all circumstances.
He can take all steps necessary to prevent the envoy taking advantage of his mission to obtain information.
In case of abuse, he has the right to detain the envoy temporarily.

Article 34
The envoy loses his rights of inviolability if it is proved beyond doubt that he has taken advantage of his privileged position to provoke or commit an act of treachery.

Contraventions of these articles constitute war crimes that may be prosecuted before the International Criminal Court.

References

Avalon Project at Yale Law School on The Laws of War — Contains the full texts of both the 1899 and 1907 Hague conventions, among other treaties.
 (2002) Elements of War Crimes Under the Rome Statute of the International Criminal Court. Sources and Commentary, Cambridge University Press, 

1907 in law
Law of war

Human rights instruments